Sven Conrad "Charlie" Stayers (9 June 1937 – 6 January 2005) was a West Indian cricketer who played in four Test matches in 1962. He played domestic cricket for Guyana as well as for Bombay for the 1962–63 Ranji Trophy season.

References

External links

"Charlie Stayers: West Indian fast bowler who helped Bombay win Ranji Trophy"

1937 births
2005 deaths
West Indies Test cricketers
Sportspeople from Georgetown, Guyana
Guyanese cricketers
Mumbai cricketers
West Zone cricketers
Guyana cricketers